Jouko Hietalahti (born 17 August 1944) is a Finnish sports shooter. He competed in two events at the 1976 Summer Olympics.

References

External links
 

1944 births
Living people
Finnish male sport shooters
Olympic shooters of Finland
Shooters at the 1976 Summer Olympics
People from Ruovesi
Sportspeople from Pirkanmaa